Lake Erie Arboretum is a young arboretum located within Frontier Park,  at the intersection of West 8th Street and Bayfront Parkway, Erie, Pennsylvania, United States. It is open to the public daily free of charge.

The arboretum was proposed in 1997 and the first tree was planted there in 1998. It now contains over 300 young trees representing some 225 tree varieties. New trees are still being added.

Some of the tree specimens represented in the arboretum include alder, catalpa, dogwood, douglas-fir, ginkgo, hawthorn, shagbark hickory, linden, honey locust, maple, scarlet oak, russian olive, tulip-tree, black walnut, and corkscrew willow.

See also
 List of botanical gardens in the United States

References

External links

Arboreta in Pennsylvania
Botanical gardens in Pennsylvania
Parks in Erie, Pennsylvania
1998 establishments in Pennsylvania